Idemitsu Kosan is a Japanese petroleum company

 may also refer to:

 Idemitsu Museum of Arts, an art museum in Tokyo, Japan

People with the surname
 Mako Idemitsu (born 1940), Japanese artist
 Sazō Idemitsu (1885–1981), founder, Idemitsu Kosan

Japanese-language surnames